Abburi may refer to:

Abburu (Abburi), village in Andhra Pradesh, India

People with the given name
Abburi Chayadevi (born 1933), Indian writer
Abburi Ravi, Indian screenwriter